Dennis D'Arcy (born 30 November 1951) is a Scottish former professional footballer who played as a central defender.

Career
Born in Aberdeen, D'Arcy began his career in junior football with Banks O' Dee, before turning professional in 1970 with Montrose. He later played for Arbroath and Deveronvale, before returning to Montrose. D'Arcy retired from professional football in 1984.

External links
 

1951 births
Living people
Footballers from Aberdeen
Scottish footballers
Banks O' Dee F.C. players
Montrose F.C. players
Arbroath F.C. players
Deveronvale F.C. players
Scottish Football League players
Scottish football managers
Peterhead F.C. managers
Montrose F.C. managers
Scottish Football League managers
Association football defenders
Highland Football League managers